General Perkins may refer to:

David G. Perkins (born 1957), U.S. Army four-star general
Ken Perkins (1926–2009), British Army major general
Simon Perkins (1771–1844), Ohio Militia brigadier general in the War of 1812